John Martin Young (February 3, 1926December 18, 2010) was an American pharmacist and Republican politician.  He served 8 years in the Wisconsin State Assembly.

Biography
Young was born on February 3, 1926, in Dubuque, Iowa. After graduating from South Division High School in Milwaukee, Wisconsin, Young attended the University of South Dakota. During World War II, he served in the United States Marine Corps. Young was married and had three children.

Political career
Young was elected to the assembly in 1978. Previously, he was a member of the Brookfield, Wisconsin, Common Council from 1972 to 1978, serving as president from 1976 to 1978. He was a Republican.

References

External links
 

Politicians from Dubuque, Iowa
Politicians from Milwaukee
People from Brookfield, Wisconsin
Republican Party members of the Wisconsin State Assembly
Wisconsin city council members
Military personnel from Milwaukee
United States Marines
United States Marine Corps personnel of World War II
University of South Dakota alumni
1926 births
2010 deaths
South Division High School alumni